The 10th National Hockey League All-Star Game took place at the Montreal Forum, home of the Montreal Canadiens, on October 9, 1956. The Canadiens, winner of the 1956 Stanley Cup Finals, played a team of All-Stars, with the game ending in a 1–1 tie.

Boxscore

Referee: Red Storey
Linesmen: Doug Davies, Bill Roberts

Notes

Named to the first All-Star team in 1955–56.
Named to the second All-Star team in 1955–56.

Citations

References
 

10th National Hockey League All-Star Game
All-Star Game
1956
Ice hockey competitions in Montreal
October 1956 sports events in Canada
1950s in Montreal
1956 in Quebec